The System Is A Vampire is an album released by New Zealand drum and bass band, Shapeshifter in 2009.

Track listing
"Dutchies"
"Lifetime"
"Longest Day"
"Fire"
"The Touch"
"Twin Galaxies"
"Warning"
"System"
"Tokyo"
"Voyager"
"Sleepless"

External links
 New Zealand Herald Review

2009 albums
Shapeshifter (band) albums